Zardanashen is a village in the Khojavend District of Azerbaijan, in the disputed region of Nagorno-Karabakh. The village had an ethnic Armenian-majority population prior to the 2020 Nagorno-Karabakh war, and also had an Armenian majority in 1989.

History 
During the Soviet period, the village was part of the Martuni District of the Nagorno-Karabakh Autonomous Oblast. After the First Nagorno-Karabakh War, the village was administrated as part of the Martuni Province of the breakaway Republic of Artsakh. The village was captured by Azerbaijan on 9 November 2020, during the 2020 Nagorno-Karabakh war.

Historical heritage sites 
Historical heritage sites in and around the village include the 18th/19th-century church of Surb Astvatsatsin.

Demographics 
The village had 95 inhabitants in 2005, and 101 inhabitants in 2015.

References

External links 
 

Populated places in Khojavend District
Nagorno-Karabakh
Former Armenian inhabited settlements